This is a list of colleges and universities that are members of Division I, the highest level of competition sponsored by the National Collegiate Athletic Association (NCAA). Currently, there are 363 institutions classified as Division I, including those in the process of transitioning from other divisions. An additional 202 institutions in one of the NCAA's other two divisions compete or will compete in Division I in at least one sport. All colleges and universities on this list are located in the United States; all states (except Alaska) plus the District of Columbia are represented by full members. Information in this list represents the forthcoming 2022–23 seasons.

Full members 
These schools are full members of Division I, meaning they either have finished the process of joining Division I or were members of its predecessor, the University Division. The teams of one university, Hartford, are in the process of departing for Division III, but compete in Division I for 2022–23.

Transitioning members 
These schools are at some point in the process of joining Division I, but as of 2022 have not yet finished the process and thus aren't yet full members. Unless stated otherwise, all transitions begin and end on July 1 of a given year.

Approved reclassifications 
All moves between divisions require NCAA approval before commencing. These schools gained this approval and as such have begun their transitions.

Partial members 

These schools are not members of Division I, but rather are members of Division II or Division III that compete in one or more sports at the Division I level. In many cases, these institutions play in Division I because their divisions do not have championships for a particular sport. Two institutions are fielding teams in a Division I sport for the first time in the 2022–23 school year. Division II Missouri S&T is fielding one team, and Division III Simpson is fielding two teams. Another institution, Alaska Anchorage, returned to fielding a team in a Division I sport in 2022.

Current partial members

Future partial members 
These schools that are members of other divisions have announced their intentions to field one team at the Division I level sometime after the 2022–23 seasons.

Years of joining reflect calendar years. For schools that will play only spring sports at the D-I level, the calendar year of joining is the year before the first season of competition.

Notes

See also 

 List of NCAA Division I athletic directors
 List of NCAA Division I conference changes before 2010
 List of NCAA Division I conference changes since 2010
 List of NCAA Division II institutions
 List of NCAA Division III institutions

References 

NCAA
Institutions